Zirtang may refer to:

Zirtang Rural District
Zirtang-e Chameshk
Zir Tang, Ilam
Zir Tang, Lorestan
Zir Tang-e Khayyat